Gutun Owain (fl. 1456–1497) was a poet in the Welsh language. He was born near Oswestry in what is now north Shropshire and was a student of Dafydd ab Edmwnd.

Gutun Owain was closely associated with the Cistercian abbey of Valle Crucis where he was the principal scribe of the S text of Brenhinoedd y Saeson preserved in the Black Book of Basingwerk, and where he may have been responsible for the continuation of that chronicle from 1333 to its end in 1461.

References

See also

Gutun Owain at Wikisource

Year of birth unknown
Year of death unknown
15th-century Welsh poets
People from Oswestry